"Him" is a song written and recorded by American singer and songwriter Rupert Holmes. It was released in January 1980 as the second single from the album, Partners in Crime.

The song peaked at number six on the US Billboard Hot 100 on March 29, 1980 and remained at that position for two weeks. It was Holmes' biggest Adult Contemporary hit, peaking at number four in both the United States and Canada.

Background
Holmes had always expected "Him" to be the lead-off single to Partners in Crime, but after record executives heard the album, they concluded that "Escape (The Piña Colada Song)", a song Holmes composed mainly as album filler and never expected to be a single, would be a major hit. After "Escape" proved to be a major hit, "Him" was released as a follow-up and itself became a hit.

The song is sung from the point of view of a man who, when he discovers a pack of cigarettes that do not belong to him, suspects that the woman in his life is cheating on him. He has no idea who this other man may be, but he decides he must confront her; he expects her to say that the other man is "just a friend", and plans to tell her bluntly, "It's me or it's him."

The midsection of this song features the melodic wordless sunshine pop chorale singing over the instrumental break that is reminiscent of The Beach Boys and The Association during the first half of the 3rd verse before jumping into "If she wants him, she can have him" in the second half.

Other versions 

In 1980, Holmes re-recorded the song in French under the title "Lui" (MCA 41252) that was backed with an instrumental version of "Guitars" (his previous album had included an English vocal version of the song). The single was released only in Canada by MCA Records Canada. This French version of "Him" ("Lui") has never been released on any vinyl or CD album. 

Also Mexican singer Jose Jose covered the song in Spanish language and was titled "Él".

Personnel
Rupert Holmes – vocals, keyboards, synthesizer, saxophone
Dean Bailin – guitar
Frank Gravis – bass
Leo Adamian – drums
Peter Gordon – French horn
Wayne Andre – trombone
Dave Taylor – bass trombone
Victoria – percussion
Gene Orloff Section – strings

Chart performance

Weekly charts

Year-end charts

References

External links
 Him by Rupert Holmes Songfacts
 Blue Desert: Rupert Holmes
 Infoplease: Rupert Holmes Biography
 Film Reference: Rupert Holmes Biography
 Rupert Holmes Biography from Who2.com
 [ Allmusic (Partners in Crime > Overview)] 
 

1979 songs
1980 singles
Rupert Holmes songs
Songs written by Rupert Holmes
MCA Records singles
Songs about infidelity
Songs about jealousy